In Aztec mythology, Xochiquetzal, also called Ichpochtli , meaning "maiden"), was a goddess associated with fertility, beauty, and love, serving as a protector of young mothers and a patroness of pregnancy, childbirth, and the crafts practiced by women such as weaving and embroidery. In pre-Hispanic Maya culture, a similar figure is Goddess I.

Name
The name Xōchiquetzal is a compound of xōchitl (“flower”) and quetzalli (“precious feather; quetzal tail feather”). In Classical Nahuatl morphology, the first element in a compound modifies the second and thus the goddess' name can literally be taken to mean “flower precious feather” or ”flower quetzal feather”. Her alternative name, Ichpōchtli, corresponds to a personalized usage of ichpōchtli (“maiden, young woman”).

Description

Unlike several other figures in the complex of Aztec female earth deities connected with agricultural and sexual fecundity, Xochiquetzal is always depicted as an alluring and youthful woman, richly attired and symbolically associated with vegetation and in particular flowers. 

By connotation, Xochiquetzal is also representative of human desire, pleasure, and excess, appearing also as patroness of artisans involved in the manufacture of luxury items.

Worshipers wore animal and flower masks at a festival, held in her honor every eight years. Her husband was Tlaloc until Tezcatlipoca kidnapped her and she was forced to marry him. At one point, she was also married to Centeotl and Xiuhtecuhtli.

Anthropologist Hugo Nutini identifies her with the Virgin of Ocotlan in his article on patron saints in Tlaxcala.

See also
Ahuiateteo
Ahwahnee
Xochicuicatl cuecuechtli
Xochipilli

Notes

References

External links

Description of the deity on Azteccalendar.com

Aztec goddesses
Beauty goddesses
Childhood goddesses
Crafts goddesses
Fertility goddesses
Love and lust goddesses
Nature goddesses
Textiles in folklore